Jens-Flemming Sørensen (30 August 1933 – 1 December 2017) was a Danish sculptor. Originally a tailor he worked most of his life as an artist of sculptures. Most of his work was fashioned from bronze and marble and frequently incorporated spherical shapes as well as depictions of the female body.

Sørensen was born in Copenhagen on 30 August 1933, and from 1987 lived and worked in Italy, mostly in the Toscana area known for its many artists. Jens-Flemming Sørensen died in Pietrasanta Italy on 1 December 2017 from natural causes.

In 1972 he was the recipient of the Eckersberg Medal.

Public art by Jens-Flemming Sørensen

References

Danish sculptors
Modern sculptors
1933 births
2017 deaths